Wolcottia is a genus of checkered beetles in the family Cleridae. There are at least three described species in Wolcottia.

Species
These three species belong to the genus Wolcottia:
 Wolcottia parviceps (Schaeffer, 1908)
 Wolcottia pedalis (LeConte, 1866)
 Wolcottia sobrina (Fall, 1906)

References

Further reading

 

Cleridae
Articles created by Qbugbot